This is a list of British television related events from 1952.

Events

January
16 January – Sooty, Harry Corbett's glove puppet bear, first appears on the BBC Television Service.

February
1 February – The first TV detector van is demonstrated. It is designed to track down users of unlicensed television sets.
15 February – The funeral of King George VI is televised in the UK.

March
14 March – The BBC Television Service is launched in Scotland.

April
No events.

May
No events.

June
No events.

July
20 July – Arrow to the Heart, the first collaboration between director Rudolph Cartier and scriptwriter Nigel Kneale, is broadcast on the BBC Television Service.

August – November
No events.

December
15 December – Bill and Ben, The Flower Pot Men premieres on the BBC Television Service.
31 December – BBC television ends the day with New Year's Eve Party from St Thomas' Hospital, London, hosted by Richard Dimbleby.
December – For the Children comes to an end after 15 years in 2 separate runs.

Debuts
19 February – Billy Bunter of Greyfriars School (1952–1961)
15 March – The Broken Horseshoe (1952)
30 July – My Wife Jacqueline (1952)
2 October – The Appleyards (1952–1957)
25 October – Operation Diplomat (1952)
4 November – Huckleberry Finn (1952)
18 December – The Flower Pot Men (1952–1958, 2001–2002)
28 December – Markheim (1952)
30 December – The Silver Swan (1952-1953)
Unknown 
Watch with Mother (1952–1975)
All Your Own (1952–1961)
Animal, Vegetable, Mineral? (1952–1959)
The Howerd Crowd (1952)

Continuing television shows

1920s
BBC Wimbledon (1927–1939, 1946–2019, 2021–2024)

1930s
The Boat Race (1938–1939, 1946–2019)
BBC Cricket (1939, 1946–1999, 2020–2024)

1940s
Kaleidoscope (1946–1953)
Muffin the Mule (1946–1955, 2005–2006)
Café Continental (1947–1953)
Television Newsreel (1948–1954)
Come Dancing (1949–1998)
How Do You View? (1949–1953)

1950s
Andy Pandy (1950–1970, 2002–2005)

Ending this year
Picture Page (1936–1939, 1946–1952)
For the Children (1937–1939, 1946–1952)

Births
 29 January – Tim Healy, actor
 2 March – John Altman, actor
 4 April – Cherie Lunghi, actress
 9 May – Patrick Ryecart, actor
 22 June – Alastair Stewart, ITN journalist and newscaster
 11 July – John Kettley, weatherman
 22 September  – Gary Holton, actor and musician (died 1985)
 27 September – Rob Bonnet, BBC sports presenter and journalist
 30 September – Jack Wild, actor (died 2006)
 4 October – Kirsten Cooke, actress
 9 October – Sharon Osbourne, music manager and promoter and television personality and presenter
 3 December – Mel Smith, comic actor and director (died 2013)
 10 December – Clive Anderson, comedy writer and radio and television personality
 20 December – Jenny Agutter, actress

See also
 1952 in British music
 1952 in the United Kingdom
 List of British films of 1952

References